Robert Ogilvie Crombie (17 May 1899– 8 March 1975), also known as "ROC", was a Scottish supernatural enthusiast and writer born in Edinburgh, Scotland in 1899 and lived there for most of his life.

Second career
Crombie abandoned his career as a scientist due to ill health, and moved from his town house in the city of Edinburgh to the country near Perth, Scotland, to be able to have closer contact with nature.

His account of some of these experiences is published in a chapter of The Findhorn Garden, a book about the early history of the Findhorn Foundation in the north east of Scotland. Crombie's verbal account of his encounters with nature spirits, accompanied by photographic slides of nature was part of the educational programme at Findhorn for many years. He was cited by his friend, the Findhorn co-founder Peter Caddy as a major influence. Crombie died in 1975.

Writing
In addition to his narration for The Findhorn Garden, 
Crombie also authored the novel The Gentleman and the Faun.

Crombie and his work was mentioned in the film My Dinner with Andre.

References

Publications
"ROC": chapter in the book "The Findhorn Garden" (1975)
"Meeting Fairies: My Remarkable Encounters with Nature Spirits" (2009)
"The Gentleman and the Faun" (2009)

External links
 
 

1899 births
1975 deaths
Scientists from Edinburgh
Scottish novelists
Writers from Edinburgh
20th-century Scottish novelists
Scottish male novelists
20th-century British male writers